Kaptan Singh Solanki (born 1 July 1939) is an Indian politician of the Bharatiya Janata Party and the 17th Governor of Tripura. From August 2009, he was the member of the Parliament of India representing Madhya Pradesh State in the Rajya Sabha, the upper house until May 2014. 

He studied at Vikram University, Ujjain, P.G.B.T. College, Ujjain and Maharani Luxmibai College, Jiwaji University, Gwalior. He served as a teacher in Banmor, Morena district from 1958 to 1965 and later became a professor at P.G.V. College, Gwalior from 1966 to 1999. He has been appointed the Governor of Haryana to replace Jagannath Pahadia whose five year term ended on 26 July 2014.

He has been married to Shrimati Rani Solanki since 1959, with two daughters and three sons.

Positions held
 Governor of Tripura from 22 August 2018 to 28 July 2019 
 Governor of Punjab (additional charge) from 21 January 2015 to 22 August 2016
 Governor of Haryana from 27 July 2014 to 21 August 2018
 Aug. 2009 Elected to Rajya Sabha 
 Aug. 2009 onwards Member, Committee on Food, Consumer Affairs and Public Distribution 
 July 2010 onwards Member, Consultative Committee for the Ministry of Youth Affairs and Sports 
 April 2012 Re-elected to Rajya Sabha (second term) 
 Aug. 2012 to May 2014 Member, Committee on Food, Consumer Affairs and Public Distribution

References

|-

|-

|-

|-

Living people
1939 births
Bharatiya Janata Party politicians from Madhya Pradesh
Rajya Sabha members from Madhya Pradesh
People from Bhind district
Madhya Pradesh academics
Governors of Haryana
Indian schoolteachers
Governors of Punjab, India
Jiwaji University alumni
Vikram University alumni